Samuel, Sam or Sammy Reid may refer to:

Samuel Chester Reid (1783–1861), American naval officer
Samuel E. Reid (1854–1924), Canadian politician
Sam Reid (actor) (born 1987), Australian actor
Sam Reid (musician) (born 1963), keyboardist with Glass Tiger
Three Australian rules footballers:
Sam Reid (footballer, born 1872) (1872–?), footballer for the Carlton Football Club in 1897
Sam Reid (footballer, born 1989), footballer for the Greater Western Sydney Giants, drafted in 2007
Sam Reid (footballer, born 1991), footballer for the Sydney Swans, drafted in 2009
Sammy Reid (1939–2014), Scottish footballer, goalscorer when Berwick Rangers defeated (Glasgow) Rangers in the 1966–67 Scottish Cup